Sipailovo() is a neighbourhood of Ufa, Bashkortostan. It is bordered by the Ufa River on the east and the south and the Glumilino neighbourhood on the north and the Inors neighbourhood on the northeast conditional. It is a residential area, containing the Kashkadan park.

Sipailovo neighbourhood is also a former Sipailovo village.

Gallery

Transport
No.110 Inors neighbourhood →Sipailovo neighbourhood→Ufa International Airport
No.101 Ufa Railway Station→Sipailovo neighbourhood→Inors neighbourhood
No.230 Dzerzhinsky Street→ Kashkadan Park (Sipailovo neighbourhood)
No.251 Ufa Station→ Kashkadan Park (Sipailovo neighbourhood)

References

Ufa neighbourhoods